Morgan's Grove is a rural historic district near Shepherdstown, West Virginia.  The area is noted for its abundant springs.  Several historic houses and farms are in the district, including:
Old Stone House and springhouse, c. 1734, belonged to the original settler and family patriarch, Richard Morgan.
Rosebrake, or Poplar Grove, built in 1745, with dependencies including a barn and outbuildings
Falling Spring, c. 1831–1837, with dependencies.  The nearby woods were a Civil War encampment. Belonged to Jacob Morgan and his son William.
Springdale c. 1760, home of Richard Morgan's son William, and dependencies. "Morgan Fort" was located on this property.
Fountain Rock in Morgan's Grove Park with the foundations of the Fountain Rock house, burned in 1864 by Federal troops.

History

18th century
Richard Morgan (ca. 1700–1763) bought lands in 1730 that included much of present-day Shepherdstown. During the French and Indian Wars, Morgan was active in raising troops from the area.

During the American Revolutionary War, local men began drilling in Shepherdstown, and two companies of riflemen were organized in July 1775 at the request of the Continental Congress.  By this time, William Morgan was a colonel in the Continental Army, and, under Morgan's command, the troops began the Bee-Line March on July 17, 1775, marching from Morgan's Grove to Boston in 24 days, covering .  The troops joined George Washington's forces on August 11, 1775, and were the first units from the South to join the fight.

19th century
During the Civil War a number of Confederate  and Federal units camped in the area, including General John B. Gordon and General George Armstrong Custer in the Valley Campaigns of 1864.  About this time, Fountain Rock, which was then owned by Confederate Colonel Alexander Boteler, was burned by Federal troops under General David Hunter.

By the late 19th century the area was used as a fairground, with its own siding off the Shenandoah Valley Railroad.  The Fountain Rock property was purchased by the Morgan's Grove Agricultural Association in 1889.  In 1900 William Jennings Bryan, then candidate for President, gave a speech to a crowd estimated at 15,000.  Fairs were held until 1931, when the land was sold and the structures were torn down.

A portion of the site is now a county park.

References

External links
 ("Rose Break" or "Dandridge House")
 ("Falling Spring" or "Steptoe House")

American Civil War sites in West Virginia
Georgian architecture in West Virginia
Greek Revival houses in West Virginia
Historic districts in Jefferson County, West Virginia
Houses on the National Register of Historic Places in West Virginia
Historic American Buildings Survey in West Virginia
Jefferson County, West Virginia in the American Civil War
National Register of Historic Places in Jefferson County, West Virginia
Vernacular architecture in West Virginia
Morgan family of West Virginia
Houses in Jefferson County, West Virginia
Historic districts on the National Register of Historic Places in West Virginia
Log buildings and structures on the National Register of Historic Places in West Virginia